The Middlebury Gorge Concrete Arch Bridge is a historic concrete arch bridge, carrying Vermont Route 125 over the Middlebury River in eastern Middlebury, Vermont.  The bridge was built in 1924, and is a well-preserved example of an early concrete bridge.  It was listed on the National Register of Historic Places in 1991.

Description and history
The Middlebury Gorge Concrete Arch Bridge is located in the upland area of eastern Middlebury, carrying Vermont Route 125 across a narrow gorge en route to one of three passes across the Green Mountains in eastern Addison County. The bridge consists of a basically semicircular arch made out of poured reinforced concrete. The sides of the bridge are simply decorated, with a beltcourse running along the length of the top, and paneled pilastered pillars at the corners.

The bridge was built in 1924, and is one of the state's few such bridges to predate (and survive) its devastating 1927 floods.  The bridge's scenic siting was judged a better setting for a more monumentally appearing arch bridge than the then-common alternative, a metal truss bridge.  The bridge was built out of eight separately poured concrete sections, using locally sourced materials.  Its principal defect is the loss of one of the corner posts.

See also
National Register of Historic Places listings in Addison County, Vermont
List of bridges on the National Register of Historic Places in Vermont

References

Road bridges on the National Register of Historic Places in Vermont
National Register of Historic Places in Addison County, Vermont
Bridges completed in 1924
Bridges in Addison County, Vermont
Buildings and structures in Middlebury, Vermont
Concrete bridges in the United States
Arch bridges in the United States